Batman: Two Faces is a DC Comics Elseworlds comic book, published in 1998. Written by Dan Abnett and Andy Lanning, with art by Anthony Williams and Tom Palmer, the story is based on the novel Strange Case of Dr. Jekyll and Mr. Hyde by Robert Louis Stevenson. A Victorian-era Bruce Wayne tries to purge both his own evil side and that of Two-Face, while a serial killer named the Joker roams the streets. A sequel, The Superman Monster, was published in October the following year.

Characters
Bruce Wayne: A millionaire and celebrated criminologist; he desperately wants to help his now-insane friend Harvey Dent.
Alfred: Bruce Wayne's butler and confidant.
The Joker: a grinning homicidal maniac who carves his victims' faces into smiles. He preys on prostitutes, making him akin to Jack the Ripper.
Selina Kyle: Owner of a brothel and a masked crimefighter who looks out for the girls under her protection. While Selina Kyle is obviously based on Catwoman, her costume is similar to that of the Black Canary and her fate (crippled by the Joker) reflects that of Barbara Gordon, making her something of a composite character.
Two-Face: District Attorney Harvey Dent was driven into a state of schizophrenic insanity when half of his face was hideously scarred. Described as a theatrical criminal, he has an obsession with dual natures and the number two. He flips a two-headed coin - one side clean, the other scarred - to make any and all decisions for him.
Peregrine White: in this story, Peregrine White is the proprietor of the Daily Planet. 
Pamela Isley: the Botanical Institute's chief officer. In this story, Pamela Isley is blonde, while she is normally represented as being red-haired.
Detective Bullock makes a brief appearance in the investigation of Batman.
Annie: the Joker's fourth victim; she was a friend and employee of Selina Kyle. She may be named after Annie Chapman, who was Jack the Ripper's second victim.

Plot
In 1888, at the Iceberg Lounge in Gotham City, Commissioner James Gordon tells his friend Peregrine White, proprietor of the newspaper the Daily Planet, a strange tale that happened two years ago.

In 1886, Bruce Wayne is organizing a gala to exhibit the Twilight Orchid, a rare flower with unique characteristics; during the day, the flower is exquisitely colored and perfumed and attracts many insects. At night, however, it turns into a weed, attracting only pests. Miss Pamela Isley, Bruce Wayne, Commissioner Gordon, and many of Gotham's finest attend the gala when Two-Face storms in and steals the flower. Bruce attempts to stop the criminal, but he easily bests him and takes Pamela as a hostage. As Two-Face and his thugs escape, they kill Pamela while Bruce Wayne watches helplessly.

Bruce blames himself for Pamela's death, and Alfred tries to comfort him. Bruce reveals that he hopes to create a potion derived from the flower, retrieved from Miss Isley's dead hands, a potion that would cure Two-Face of his dual personality. Finalizing the potion, Bruce tests it on himself. He suddenly develops superhuman strength, agility, and a new sense of courage and purpose. He puts together a bat-like costume and sets off to battle crime on Two Face's terms.

While Batman destroys Two Face's criminal empire, Annie, a prostitute who works at Selina Kyle's brothel, accompanies a strange gentleman. The man starts laughing hysterically and kills Annie, who is revealed to be his fourth victim.

Commissioner Gordon asks Bruce Wayne for help, the serial killer who calls himself the Joker is murdering women and mutilating them to look like they are smiling. Bruce dons his cape and cowl and gets ready to take down the psychopath. Selina Kyle, donning a crimefighting outfit of her own, attacks him. After revealing to her his true identity, they decide to team up in their efforts to capture the smiling murderer.

Selina comes upon the Joker, attacking a group of Two Face's lackeys. Selina tries her best to stop him, but she is no match for his superhuman strength. She tries to run but is injured by the Joker, and by the time Batman arrives to help her, her condition has gotten worse. She is paralyzed from the waist down and will never walk again. Alfred tries to convince Bruce to stop drinking the potion, which has some detrimental effects. Bruce dismisses his advice and consumes a more powerful batch than before. He falls into a deep sleep and wakes up with a head full of revelations. He writes a letter to Gordon, and another to Two-Face, summoning them to a meeting that will be most revealing.

Batman reveals to Gordon that he is putting himself at the law's mercy and to Two-Face that he has a potion that may cure him of his duality. He handcuffs himself and then transforms into the Joker, the opposite side of the Batman. Just as one side was courageous and doing his best to stop crime, the other was bent on destruction and chaos. Two-Face, Gordon, and the Joker fight, and just as the Joker is about to kill Two-Face, the Batman takes control of Bruce's body, and he falls to his death. After flipping his two-headed coin one last time, Two-Face, acting on Bruce's last wishes, takes the potion and creates a new identity for himself, a superhuman who dons the cape and cowl of Batman, fighting for the side of justice.

At the end of the story, White then refers to another story that occurred in Bavaria, five years before this tale, one that is filled with "inhuman tragedy and blasphemous outrages against nature". This story is revealed in the sequel, The Superman Monster, a retelling of Frankenstein featuring the Superman cast.

Publication
 Batman: Two Faces #1 (paperback, 68 pages, November 1998)

See also
 List of Elseworlds publications
 Gotham by Gaslight
 JLA: The Island of Dr. Moreau
 Wonder Woman: Amazonia

References

Batman: Two Faces at Grand Comics Database
Batman: Two Faces at Comic Book Database

Batman titles
Comics by Andy Lanning
Comics by Dan Abnett
Elseworlds titles
Comics about Jack the Ripper
Superhero comics
1998 comics debuts
Adaptations of works by Robert Louis Stevenson
Fiction set in 1886
Fiction set in 1888